Ahsanul Haq Mollah (known as Pancha Mollah; died 12 December 2003) was a Bangladesh Nationalist Party politician and a 4-term Jatiya Sangsad member representing the Kushtia-1 constituency. He served as the State Minister of Post and Telecommunication in the Second Khaleda Cabinet during 2001–2003.

Suffering from liver cancer, Mollah was taken to Bumrungrad Hospital in Bangkok on 23 November 2003. He was later declared clinically dead and he  died after his arrival in Dhaka on the way to Bangabandhu Sheikh Mujib Medical University. His son, Bachhu Mollah, was later elected in a by-election for the vacant position of Jatiya Sangsad membership representing the Kushtia-1 constituency.

References

1930s births
2003 deaths
Bangladesh Nationalist Party politicians
State Ministers of Posts, Telecommunications and Information Technology
People from Kushtia District
5th Jatiya Sangsad members
6th Jatiya Sangsad members
7th Jatiya Sangsad members
8th Jatiya Sangsad members